In topology and high energy physics, the Wu–Yang dictionary refers to the mathematical identification that allows to translate back and forth between the concepts of gauge theory and those of differential geometry. It was devised by Tai Tsun Wu and C. N. Yang in 1975 when studying the relation between electromagnetism and fiber bundle theory. This dictionary has been credited as bringing mathematics and theoretical physics closer together. 

A crucial example of the success of the dictionary is that it allowed to understand Paul Dirac's monopole quantization in terms of Hopf fibrations.

History 
In 1975, theoretical physicists Tsun Wu and C. N. Yang working in Stony Brook University, published a paper on the mathematical framework of electromagnetism and the Aharonov–Bohm effect in terms of fiber bundles. A year later, mathematician Isadore Singer came to visit and brought a copy back to the University of Oxford. Singer showed the paper to Michael Atiyah and other mathematicians, sparking a close collaboration between physicists and mathematicians.

Yang also recounts a conversation that he had with one of the mathematicians that founded fiber bundle theory, Shiing-Shen Chern:

Description

Summarized version 
The Wu-Yang dictionary relates terms in particle physics with terms in mathematics, specifically fiber bundle theory. Many versions and generalization of the dictionary exist. Here is an example of a dictionary, which puts each physics term next to its mathematical analogue:

Original version for electromagnetism 

Wu and Yang considered the description of an electron traveling around a cylinder in the presence of a magnetic field inside the cylinder (outside the cylinder the field vanishes i.e. ). For two different fluxes a and b, the results are identical if , where  is an integer. We define the operator  as the operator that brings the electron wave function from one configuration to the other . For an electron that takes a path from point P to point Q, we define the phase factor a 
, 
where  is the electromagnetic four-potential. For the case of a SU2 gauge field, we can make the substitution
, 
where  are the generators of SU2,  are the Pauli matrices. Under these concepts, Wu and Yang showed the relation between the language of gauge theory and fiber bundles, was codified in following dictionary:

See also
 't Hooft–Polyakov monopole
 Wu–Yang monopole

References 

Gauge theories
Differential geometry
Geometry